Frankton is a ghost town in Medicine Township, Rooks County, Kansas, United States.

History
Frankton was issued a post office in 1883. The post office was discontinued in 1887.  There is nothing left of Frankton.

References

Former populated places in Rooks County, Kansas
Former populated places in Kansas
1883 establishments in Kansas
Populated places established in 1883